Rakovitsa may refer to:

 Rakovitsa, a village in Makresh Municipality near Vidin, Bulgaria
 Golema Rakovitsa, a village near Sofia, Bulgaria

See also
 Rakovica (disambiguation)